State Route 104 (SR 104) is a  state highway in the east-central part of the U.S. state of Georgia. Most of its eastern portion is an urban corridor in the Augusta metropolitan area. It travels within portions of Columbia and Richmond counties. It is known as Washington Road from its western terminus to the Columbia–Richmond county line. On both sides of the county line, it is known as Pleasant Home Road. It is known as Riverwatch Parkway from just west of the county line to the northern part of downtown Augusta. In downtown, it is known as part of Jones Street and Reynolds Street.

Route description
SR 104 begins at an blinker-light intersection with U.S. Route 221 (US 221), SR 47, and SR 150 in Pollards Corner. It travels to the southeast as part of Washington Road and crosses over Kiokee Creek on the Robert W. Pollard Bridge. Just over  later, it crosses over Little Kiokee Creek on the B. Edward Tankersley Memorial Bridge. Slightly more than  after that, it crosses over Euchee Creek on the G.B. "Dip" Lamkin Bridge. Just before entering Evans, and just at the intersection with William Few Parkway, the highway transitions into a retail corridor. In Evans, it travels southwest of Evans Towne Center Park and intersects the northern terminus of SR 383 (North Belair Road). SR 104 curves to the south-southeast and intersects both the eastern terminus of Towne Centre Drive and the western terminus of Riverwatch Parkway. It then curves to the east and intersects SR 232 (Columbia Road) and the southern terminus of Ruth Street on the Evans–Martinez line. At an intersection with the southern terminus of Old Evans Road, SR 232 splits off to the south-southeast onto Bobby Jones Expressway. After curving to the east-southeast, SR 104 enters Richmond County and the city limits of Augusta.

Immediately after entering the county, SR 104 intersects the western terminus of SR 104 Connector (SR 104 Conn.), which takes the Washington Road name. The mainline route turns left onto Pleasant Home Road, briefly re-enters Columbia County, and immediately turns right onto Riverwatch Parkway. Less than  after that turn, it re-enters Richmond County. Approximately  later, it intersects SR 28 (Furys Ferry Road). The roadway travels to the northeast and curves back to the southeast, to an interchange with Interstate 20 (I-20; Carl Sanders Highway). SR 104 curves to a more east-southeasterly direction. After curving around the eastern side of Eisenhower Park, the highway begins paralleling the Savannah River, before it crosses over the Augusta Canal on the William "Billy" L. Powell Jr. Bridge. The highway has an interchange that leads to downtown Augusta and the Medical District. About  later is another crossing of the canal, this time on an unnamed bridge. Just after this crossing, at an intersection with 15th Street, Riverwatch Parkway ends; eastbound traffic uses Jones Street, while westbound traffic uses Reynolds Street. Three blocks later, SR 104 meets its eastern terminus, an intersection with US 25 Business/SR 4 (13th Street). Here, both Jones Street and Reynolds Street continues as a two-way street.

National Highway System
All of SR 104 is included as part of the National Highway System, a system of roadways important to the nation's economy, defense, and mobility.

Milepost numbering
All of SR 104’s milepost numbering increases westward instead of eastward inversely, due to a use of a south-to-north numbering instead of the usual west-to-east system.

History
The road that would eventually become SR 104 was established by the middle of 1930 as SR 52 just east of the Columbia–Richmond county line. By the third quarter of 1932, SR 52 was redesignated as SR 104 and was extended northwest to Phinizy. This extension was unimproved, but maintained. By the end of 1934, a small segment was under construction northwest of the county line. By the end of the next year, a segment of the highway, farther to the northwest had completed grading, but was not surfaced. A year later, the under construction segment had completed grading, but was not surfaced. It was under construction for the rest of its length. By the end of the year, the highway had a completed hard surface from about Evans to the SR 52 intersection in Martinez. A few months later, it had a completed hard surface segment just northwest of Evans. In early 1940, it had completed grading, but was not surfaced from Phinizy to just northwest of Evans. By the end of the year, it had a sand clay or top soil surface from Phinizy to just northwest of Evans. About five years later, SR 104 had a completed hard surface from just southeast of Pollards Corner to just northwest of Evans. By the end of 1946, it was hard surfaced from Leah to just southeast of that community. By March 1948, it was hard surfaced from Pollards Corner to just southeast of that community. Before the end of the first quarter of 1949, the highway was hard surfaced from Leah to Pollards Corner. By 1988, the Leah-to-Pollards Corner segment was redesignated as SR 47, due to that highway being shifted to the east.

Riverwatch Parkway was originally constructed in the late 1980s and early 1990s to relieve heavy rush-hour traffic on congested Washington Road and John C. Calhoun Expressway, which many Augusta area residents used (and continue to use) to travel to and from work.

Major intersections

Augusta connector route

State Route 104 Connector (SR 104 Conn.) is a  connector route that exists entirely within the northern part of Richmond County. Its entire route is within the city limits of Augusta. It is known as Washington Road for its entire length.

It begins just east of the Columbia-Richmond county line, at an intersection with the SR 104 mainline (also known as Washington Road west of this intersection and turns onto Pleasant Home Road at it). The highway travels east-southeast until it meets its eastern terminus, an intersection with SR 28 (known as Furys Ferry Road west of this intersection and takes on the Washington Road name at it).

All of SR 104 Connector is included as part of the National Highway System.

Major intersections

See also

References

External links

Georgia Roads (Routes 101-120)

104
Transportation in Richmond County, Georgia
Transportation in Columbia County, Georgia
Transportation in Augusta, Georgia
Expressways in the United States
Parkways in the United States